Theofanis Siatisteus (Selitsa, Voio, died 1868) was a fighter in the Greek War of Independence and a cleric.

References 

1868 deaths
People from Askio, Kozani
Greek people of the Greek War of Independence
Year of birth missing